Pandeshwar  is a residential and commercial locality in the city of Mangalore, Karnataka, India. It is one of the upscale residential, commercial, and financial centres of Mangalore. It houses some of the highrise buildings and many more under pipeline. It is close to Mangaladevi Temple, which is one of the well known temples of Mangalore. It is just half a mile away from the  Mangalore Central railway station, Mangalore City Bus Stand and Nehru Maidan. Pandeshwar is surrounded by Hoige Bazaar, Yemmekere & State Bank.

The Headquarters of the Corporation Bank, one of the leading public sector banks of India is located in this area.

The Forum Fiza Mall, largest mall in Mangalore & one of the largest malls in India is also located here. Pandeshwar houses few government offices as well.

Gallery

References

Localities in Mangalore